Artsakh may refer to:

Places 
 Republic of Artsakh, a breakaway state in the South Caucasus which is de facto independent, de jure considered a part of Azerbaijan
 Nagorno-Karabakh, region in the South Caucasus, also known as Artsakh
 Artsakh (historic province), in the ancient Kingdom of Armenia
 Kingdom of Artsakh, a medieval Armenian Kingdom

Other uses
 "Artsakh" (song), a 1999 instrumental folk song by Armenian composer Ara Gevorgyan
 "Artsakh", a single by Armenian American composer and singer Serj Tankian

See also 
 
 Arsak (disambiguation)
 Karabakh (disambiguation)